Schuler Books is an independent bookseller with three locations in the US state of Michigan. Along with new and used books, Schuler stores feature an extensive gift section, magazines, print on demand services, event spaces, and a café.

History
Schuler was founded in 1982 by Bill and Cecile Fehsenfeld in Grand Rapids, Michigan. The original store was located on 28th Street, and predominantly sold new books and newspapers. It did not have a café, though the store served espresso drinks via a kiosk cart. A much larger store opened in 1995 a few blocks west of the original location, with The Chapbook Café and expanded offerings with music among other items.

Schuler expanded to the Lansing area in 1990 with a store in Okemos. In 2001, it moved to the Meridian Mall. A second Lansing location opened at Eastwood Towne Center in 2002, and closed on February 3, 2018. 6,000 used books from the Eastwood store's inventory were donated to the Friends of the East Lansing Public Library following its closure.

A second Grand Rapids-area location opened in Walker in 2003, and closed in 2014.

In 2007, Schuler opened a location in downtown Grand Rapids, in part of the former Steketee's department store. This store closed in 2013.

Schuler acquired an Espresso Book Machine in 2009, and began offering print on demand books.

In 2014, Schuler acquired Ann Arbor bookstore Nicola's Books. The store retained its original name until July 2022, when it was rebranded as Schuler. Schuler acquired a neighboring storefront for an expansion of the store, with plans to complete the expansion by December 2022.

In August 2022, Schuler announced an expansion into the Detroit market, with a store in West Bloomfield to open in April, 2023.

Locations

 Grand Rapids
 2975 28th St. SE, Grand Rapids, Michigan — opened 1982, closed 1995, moving to:
 2660 28th St. SE, Grand Rapids, Michigan — opened 1995
 Okemos
 4800 Okemos Rd., Okemos, Michigan – opened 1990, closed 2001, moving to:
 Meridian Mall, 1982 West Grand River Ave., Okemos, Michigan — opened 2001
 East Lansing
 2820 Centre Blvd., Lansing, Michigan — opened 2002, closed 2018
 Walker
 3165 Alpine Ave. NW, Walker, Michigan — opened 2003, closed 2014
 Grand Rapids – Downtown
 40 Fountain St., NW, Grand Rapids, Michigan — opened 2007, closed 2013
 Ann Arbor
 2509 Jackson Ave., Ann Arbor, Michigan — acquired 2014
 West Bloomfield
 7260 Orchard Lake Rd., West Bloomfield, Michigan — opening April 2023

References

External links
Schuler Books

Bookstores in Michigan
Independent bookstores of the United States
Companies based in Grand Rapids, Michigan
1982 establishments in Michigan
Retail companies established in 1982
American companies established in 1982